Ege Kökenli (born 20 March 1993) is a Turkish actress.

Kökenli was born in 1993 in Kırklareli. She has a younger brother, named Mert. She finished her secondary education there and then moved to Istanbul in order to enroll in a French high school. She then became a member of a theatre team who performed in French for 5 years and gave concerts. She made her television debut at the age of 11 with a role in the fantasy child series En İyi Arkadaşım. She finished her studies at the Haliç University Conservatory and then at Istanbul Bilgi University. She continued her career in television with roles in popular series Anadolu Kaplanı, Yahşi Cazibe, Öğretmen Kemal, Çalıkuşu, Çiçek, Asla Vazgeçmem, Güneşin Kızları and ''Kalp Atışı.

Filmography

References

External links 
 
 

1993 births
Living people
Turkish film actresses
Turkish television actresses
21st-century Turkish actresses